Miss Dominion of Canada was a beauty pageant held in Niagara Falls, Ontario for many years, primarily at the Sheraton Brock Hotel, on July 1, Canada's Dominion Day (now known as "Canada Day"), beginning in 1959.  The winner of this pageant represented Canada at four of the world's largest international beauty pageants, Miss Universe (until 1977), Miss World (1962–1979), Miss International, and Queen of the Pacific.  The Miss Dominion of Canada pageant originated when the Bruno family of Ancaster, Ontario, obtained franchise rights to select and send Canada's exclusive representatives to these international pageants. As many as 40 contestants selected via local pageants across many provinces of Canada competed in the annual Niagara Falls competition.   Throughout the 1970s, there were generally between twelve and twenty contestants competing at the final judging.

Selection Process
Most contestants progressed through as many as five consecutive preliminary local and regional pageants, somewhat similar to a golfer winning progressively more competitive golf tournaments, victorious in each one until finally winning the highest level competition.  The Miss Dominion pageant required the finalists to participate in events including evening dress, swimsuit, interviews, talent, and various singing and dancing vignettes.  Notable individuals selected as pageant judges would then select the runners up and the winner.

Duties and Responsibilities of Miss Dominion of Canada
The contestant selected as Miss Dominion of Canada would visit nearly every Canadian province and other countries such as the United States, Japan, Australia, and Europe during her one-year reign. Until 1977, Miss Dominion of Canada was the country's representative at Miss Universe. The Miss Universe franchise in Canada was taken over by the nationally televised Miss Canada contest in 1978. Miss Dominion of Canada also represented the country at Miss World from 1962 to 1979 after which the franchise was taken over by Miss World Canada.

Notable Miss Canada Winners
Famous or notable winners of this pageant include Sandra Campbell of Leamington, Ontario, who became a television personality in Sydney, Australia (Celebrity Squares and One in a Million) and a marketing executive with a major American corporation.  Another notable winner is Jacquie Perrin, who for more than a decade was the host of CBC TV's award-winning investigative consumer program, Market Place. Now at CBC Newsworld, Jacquie has been involved in various special news projects and is seen weekly as the host of highly rated Saturday Report. Mary Lou Farrell made guest appearances on the Lawrence Welk Show, and used her stage name Aniko in performing in many Broadway musicals.

The Pageant Lives On
Rumours that the Miss Dominion of Canada Pageant continued beyond 1979 have been present for many years. Despite the lack of media coverage from Canadian media, Miss Dominion of Canada delegates continued to represent Canada at various international contests, including Miss International, Maja Internacional and others throughout the 1980s. These women were selected by the franchise owners as Miss Dominion of Canada from 1980 until at least 1991; they included Linda Farrell (1987), Lee-Ann Bruce (1988) and Robin Nardi (1989).

There was also a Miss Teen Dominion of Canada Pageant for at least one year in the early 1970s.

Miss Dominion of Canada Pageant Director John Bruno died in 2004.

A history of Canadian beauty contests, including Miss Dominion of Canada, is currently under development in book form.

Winners of Miss Dominion of Canada Pageant

   *Forfeited title September 19, 1962

See also
Miss Canada
Miss Earth Canada
Miss Universe Canada
Miss World Canada

References
Pageantopolis

Beauty pageants in Canada
1959 establishments in Ontario
Canadian awards
Culture of Niagara Falls, Ontario